The Belle of Bohemia is an Edwardian musical comedy in two acts which opened on Broadway in 1900 before having a run on the West End of London in 1901. It was one of a series of musicals with Belle in the title that were popular on both sides of the Atlantic in the Edwardian era.

Production

It had been intended that The Belle of Bohemia would open at the Hyperion Theatre in New Haven, Connecticut on 22 September 1900, but the day before its scheduled opening its producer George Lederer found himself in a legal dispute as a result of which four police officers were sent to the Hyperion to ensure the production would not leave New Haven. After some legal maneuvring the production was able to go to New York where it opened at the Casino Theatre on 24 September 1900 and closed on 10 November 1900, having a run of 55 performances. Included in the cast were Lotta Faust, Virginia Earle, Sam Bernard as Adolph Klotz, and also featured Trixie Friganza, Sol Solomon, D. L. Don, Fred Titus and John Hyams (all of whom went on to appear in the London production in the following year) with  Marguerite Clark making her Broadway début in the production. The musical was produced by George Lederer with music by Ludwig Engländer and Harry Truman MacConnell to a book by Harry B. Smith and with lyrics by Harry B. Smith in a plot that borrows heavily from Plautus and Shakespeare. The case of mistaken identity in the New York version was helped by the fact that the two leading actors, Dick and Sam Bernard were brothers. Despite the fact that "the costumes were distinctly not up to the Casino average" and some of the road signs in the scenes were misspelt, the show was generally well received.

The Belle of Bohemia was the first production to be staged at the new Apollo Theatre in London on its opening night on 21 February 1901 and starred Marie George, Richard Carle and Marie Dainton. The British premiere on 21 February caused some controversy as it was performed before an invited audience with the first public performance being on the next day - 22 February. This resulted in a small disturbance at the theatre's opening  with The Times in particular refusing to write a review of the 'private' performance and went to that the next day explaining that "part of the duty of a newspaper in dealing with theatrical entertainments is to record their reception by the public, and this cannot, of course, be done when the ordinary paying public are not admitted." While The Guardian commented that "it is to be regretted that so elegant a building should have opened its doors to the public with an entertainment of such inferior calibre" During the run the show was 'overhauled with manifest advantage' resulting in The Belle of Bohemia managing a run of 72 performances until 10 May 1900.

Synopsis

Smith based The Belle of Bohemia on Plautus's Menaechmi with its case of mistaken identity.
Act I – Klotz's Tin-Type Gallery at Coney Island
Act II: 
Scene I – Dinkelhauser's Villa at Newport
Scene II – Garden of Same
Scene III: Chateau in Switzerland

Adolph Klotz, a Coney Island photographer, is married to Katie, a singer. Klotz bears a striking resemblance to Rudolph Dinkelhauser, a prosperous brewer. When Klotz commits misdeeds while drunk Dinkelhauser is blamed in a case of mistake identity and is thrown in jail. Klotz manages to set himself up in Dinkelhauser's mansion in Newport. Each of the men pretends to be the husband of the other's wife, which causes confusion. Adding to this, local politician Phelim McDuffy and his 'matinee girl' daughter Geraldine try to cheat Dinkelhauser out of a Swiss chateau he has inherited from his uncle. When all the cast journey to Switzerland all the identities are corrected and Dinkelhauser saves his chateau.

Musical numbers

The Amateur Entertainer
Be Clever
Beer, Beautiful Beer
The Fairies Lullaby
The Girl Who Is Up to Date
The Matinee Girl
Never Again
Only in Dreams
My Lady in the Moon
What Eve Said to Adam – Katie
The Wishing Cap
He Was a Married Man' – Adolph Klotz
My Mobile Gal
She Never Loved a Man as Much as That

The score consisted of waltzes, 'coon songs', love songs and a wide range of other musical types.

New York cast
 
Rudolph Dinkelhauser (A Brewer) – Dick Bernard
Adolph Klotz (A Wandering Photographer) – Sam Bernard
Algy Cuffs (A Matinee Idol, leading man at a popular New York Theatre) – Paul F. Nicholson Jr.
Yellowplush (Dinkelhauser's English Valet) – Frederick Solomon
Arris – Sol Solomon
Holligan – Fred Titus
Mrs. Muggins – Trixie Friganza
Katie – Virginia Earle
Camembert – Otto Heilig
Phelim McDuffy – D. L. Don
Geraldine McDuffy – Irene Bentley

London cast

Rudolph Dinkelhauser (A Brewer) – Dave Lewis
Adolph Klotz (A Wandering Photographer) – D. L. Don
Dolphin Shark (An Influential Politician and Lawyer) – George A. Schiller
Yellowplush (Dinkelhauser's English Valet) – Charles A. Maynard
Chick Riley (The Pride of the Bowery) – John Hyams
Dr. Pilsbury (A Veterinary Surgeon) – James A. Furey
Ludwig Dollar (Solo Cornetist) – Sol Solomon
Holligan (Two of the Finest) – Fred Titus
Mulligan (Two of the Finest) – Joseph Sullivan
Algy Cuffs (A Matinee Idol, leading man at a popular New York Theatre) – Richard Carle
Katie (Wife of Klotz, and a Serio-Comic Singer known as Mlle. Clarisse) – Marie George
Paquita (Formerly Spanish Dancer, Wife of Dinkelhauser) – Marie Dainton
Angelica Shark (A Matinee Girl) – Anna Laughlin
Mamie (Otherwise La Sahara, a Snake Charmer and Fortune Teller) – Sylvia Thorne
Chloe (Nurse to Dinkelhauser) – Trixie Friganza

Matinee Girls:
Sadie Stuyvesant – Vashti Earle
Mamie Livingstone – Ruby Jay
Carrie Van Courtlandt – Lou Middleton
Daisy Manhattan – Cecilia Rohda
Laura Astergill – Jessie Banks
Hattie Van Tiviller – Lulu Shepherd
Nettie Rubygold – Don Kersley
Myrtle Claremont – Mildred Devere

References

1900 compositions
1900 musicals
British musicals
Broadway musicals
Original musicals